Auditorio Francisco Eduardo Tresguerras is a 2,407-seat indoor arena located in Celaya, Guanajuato, Mexico.  It was built in 1990 and is used primarily for concerts, basketball, boxing, lucha libre and other special events.

The arena contains a permanent stage and removable floor seating in addition to permanent balcony seating.

External links
Auditorio Tresguerras at vamosaguanajuato.com
Pagina oficial

Music venues in Mexico
Buildings and structures in Guanajuato
Boxing venues in Mexico